BISC may refer to:

 Ballot Initiative Strategy Center
 British International School in Casablanca
 British International School in Cairo
 BISC (database)